António Maria de Fontes Pereira de Melo GCTE KGF (Lisbon, 8 September 1819 – 22 January 1887) was a Portuguese statesman and engineer. He was a leading parliamentarian and political figure of his time. Among other posts held, he was six times minister of finance and minister of public works. From 1871 to 1886, he served three times as prime minister of Portugal, for a total of 11 years.

Fontes Pereira de Melo is mostly remembered for implementing dynamic industrial and public infrastructure policy, which became known as Fontismo (after his name). He also implemented educational reforms in accordance with the industrialization process he initiated (see Instituto Industrial de Lisboa and Escola Industrial do Porto).

Early life 
Born on 8 September 1819 in Lisbon, António Maria de Fontes Pereira de Melo was the son of João de Fontes Pereira de Melo, a Portuguese Navy officer, later governor of Cape Verde and minister of state, and his wife Jacinta Venância Rosa da Cunha Matos. He was the fourth child of six.

Having not yet reached the age of 14, Fontes joined the Portuguese Royal Naval Academy in the midst of the civil war between absolutists and liberals. Two months later, in October 1833, during the siege of Lisbon by absolutist forces, the young cadet took part in the successful defence of the city led by Napier. In the following three years, he pursued his midshipman training, excelling in mathematics. He graduated in 1837, receiving a prize for students of exceptional merit that had only been awarded twice in twenty years.

In 1836, wishing to pursue more advanced studies, Fontes enrolled in the three-year course of military engineering at the School of the Army. He graduated as lieutenant of the Royal Corps of Engineers in 1839.

In the same year, an appointed aide to his father, then governor of Cape Verde, Fontes moved to the territory, where he resided until 1842, producing reports and maps and working on various projects. At the age of 21, Fontes married Maria Josefa de Sousa, daughter of an influent merchant of Cape Verde. On his return to Lisbon, he attended the astronomy course at the Polytechnic School, but his studies were interrupted by a personal tragedy, the death of his wife and, soon after, of his only daughter. He would not marry again.

After the end of the civil war and the triumph of the liberals, the country remained mired in political and military instability. In December 1846, during the Patuleia revolt, the Duke of Saldanha decided to confront the advancing revolutionary troops in Torres Vedras. Saldanha commissioned Fontes, an engineering officer on his staff, to conduct the reconnaissance of the battlefield. After the victory of the government troops, the mission earned Fontes the Tower and Sword cross and the recognition of the marshal-duke.

In 1848, while Saldanha was head of government, and after his father had a short stint as navy and overseas minister, Fontes ran to parliament by the constituency of Cape Verde. The constituency had a very small electorate and was controlled by the family to which he had become connected through marriage. His election was initially rejected by a parliament committee dominated by opposition members, but after much dispute finally approved.

President of the Council of Ministers

He ran for the Regenerator Party starting in 1850. He later became prime minister for the first term on 13 September 1871. The government reconstituted the country after the January Revolution and a few governments, entirely disorganized.  He succeeded and was later succeeded by Marquess of Ávila He left in 1877 after the banking crisis in 1876. A year later after the 1878 elections, he was again prime minister after his electoral victory.  A year later, he asked to be dismissed from the cabinet and he left office and Anselmo José Braamcamp organized that cabinet.  In 1880, he was president of the Central Commission of 1 December 1640 In 1881, he was given the presidency of the Chamber of Peers after the death of the Duke of Ávila and Bolama. Later on 11 November, Fontes was preparing to create a new government. That new government had a principal mission: modify the state's constitution for the new Additional Act to the Constitutional Chart which was promulgated in 1885, which transformed the Chamber of Peers of hereditary in life. The organization of military reforms made by himself included new regiments in the infantry, two in the cavalry and artillery, later he started to buy more torpedo boats. He left the government on 16 February 1886.  After finishing his third and last term, he was succeeded by José Luciano de Castro.

Death
In 1887, he was preparing for a new opposition campaign over the cabinet and actively directed the electoral works, Pereira de Melo suffered an illness and died on 22 January 1887 at the palace at 6 Páteo do Tijolo in Mercês, Lisbon where he lived.

Family
His younger sister, Maria Henriqueta de Fontes Pereira de Melo, wife of Vicente Rodrigues Ganhado, was granted the noble title of 1st Marchioness of Fontes Pereira de Melo.

Legacy
The Fontes Pereira de Melo Lighthouse in the easternmost point of the island of Santo Antão in northwestern Cape Verde was named for him, it was first constructed when he was prime minister in his later years and was completed in the year that he was no longer prime minister. Now it is called the Ponta do Tumbo Lighthouse.

See also
 History of Portugal
 Portugal

References

Further reading

 

1819 births
1887 deaths
People from Lisbon
Regenerator Party politicians
Prime Ministers of Portugal
Finance ministers of Portugal
Government ministers of Portugal
Colonial heads of Cape Verde
19th-century Portuguese politicians
Portuguese engineers
Knights of the Golden Fleece of Spain
Grand Crosses of the Order of Saint-Charles
Naval ministers of Portugal